The Mur de Huy is a  high hill located in Huy, Wallonia, Belgium. It is also known as le Chemin des Chapelles because of the seven chapels along its route. This climb is famous for being part of the route of La Flèche Wallonne professional cycling race. It also served as the finish for the third stage of the 2015 Tour de France.

La Flèche Wallonne 
The Mur de Huy has been the site of the finishing line of the Flèche Wallonne since 1984  and of the La Flèche Wallonne Féminine since 1998. It is climbed three times for men's and two times for women's with the finishing line at the top of the last climb up the Mur. The Flèche Wallonne is often decided on its slopes.

References

External links
Photos and description on velo-club.net 

Climbs in cycle racing in Belgium
La Flèche Wallonne
Mountains and hills of Liège Province
Huy